Matouš Ruml (born 4 October 1985) is a Czech actor, known mainly for his role in the TV series Comeback.

Biography 
Ruml was born on 4 October 1985 in Prague, Czechoslovakia. He studied at Prague Conservatory, before joining the City Theatre in Mladá Boleslav on 1 August 2008.

Theatre

City Theatre
A Midsummer Night's Dream - Lysander

Švanda Theatre
Dorotka - Marek
Job
Trojánky

Theatre of Conservatory
School for Women - Horace
Ťululum - Servants, Jára Cimrman Theatre
Výprodej
Hodina mezi psem a vlkem - Philip Sermoy
As You Like It - Orlando
Kytice - Wayfarer
The Playboy of the Western World - Christy Mahon

Other theatres 
The Patient of Doctor Freud - Adolf Hitler, Komorní činohra
Noc Bohů - Jester, Komorní činohra
Equus - Alan Strang
Mam'zelle Nitouche, ABC Theatre, Prague
The Merry Wives of Windsor - Robin, ABC Theatre, Prague
Arcadia, Estates Theatre, Prague
West Side Story - Prcek, Northern Bohemian Theatre, Ústí nad Labem
Zdravý nemocný - Notary/Tomáš, Klicpera Theatre
Obchodník s deštěm - Bill Starbuck, A Studio Rubín

Filmography 
10 Rules (2014)
"Ozzákova škola kalení" (2008) TV series - Lexa
"Comeback" (2008) TV series - Lexa Bůček
Tajemství Lesní země (2006) (TV)
"Život na Zámku" (1994) TV series - Pavel

Personal life 
Ruml has an older brother. He is married to actress Tereza Rumlová, and they have a son, Nathanael.

References

External links 
Osobnosti.cz
Czechoslovak Film Database
Nova.cz

Czech male stage actors
Czech male television actors
Living people
1985 births
Male actors from Prague
21st-century Czech male actors
Czech male child actors
Prague Conservatory alumni
Recipients of the Thalia Award